A scalpel, lancet, or bistoury is a small and extremely sharp bladed instrument used for surgery, anatomical dissection, podiatry and various arts and crafts (either called a hobby knife or an X-acto knife.). Scalpels may be single-use disposable or re-usable. Re-usable scalpels can have permanently attached blades that can be sharpened or, more commonly, removable single-use blades. Disposable scalpels usually have a plastic handle with an extensible blade (like a utility knife) and are used once, then the entire instrument is discarded. Scalpel blades are usually individually packed in sterile pouches but are also offered non-sterile. Double-edged scalpels are referred to as "lancets".

Scalpel blades are usually made of hardened and tempered steel, stainless steel, or high carbon steel; in addition, titanium, ceramic, diamond and even obsidian knives are not uncommon. For example, when performing surgery under MRI guidance, steel blades are unusable (the blades would be drawn to the magnets and would also cause image artifacts). Historically, the preferred material for surgical scalpels was silver. Scalpel blades are also offered by some manufacturers with a zirconium nitride–coated edge to improve sharpness and edge retention.  Others manufacture blades that are polymer-coated to enhance lubricity during a cut. Alternatives to scalpels in surgical applications include electrocautery and lasers.

Surgical scalpels 

Surgical scalpels consist of two parts, a blade and a handle. The handles are often reusable, with the blades being replaceable. In medical applications, each blade is only used once (sometimes just for a single, small cut).

 The handle is also known as a "B.P. handle", named after Charles Russell Bard and Morgan Parker, founders of the Bard-Parker Company. Morgan Parker patented the 2-piece scalpel design in 1915 and Bard-Parker developed a method of cold sterilization that would not dull the blades, as did the heat-based method that was previously used.

The handle of medical scalpels come in several basic types. The first is a flat handle used in the #3 and #4 handles. The #7 handle is more like a long writing pen, rounded at the front and flat at the back. A #4 handle is larger than a #3.  #5 handles are also common, and are round, with a patterning to ensure a non-slip grip. Blades are manufactured with a corresponding fitment size so that they fit on only one size handle.  The following table of blades is incomplete and some blades listed may work with handles not specified here.

A lancet has a double-edged blade and a pointed end for making small incisions or drainage punctures.

Types of blades

Gripping a medical scalpel

Palmar grip 
Also called the "dinner knife" grip. The handle is held with the second through fourth fingers and secured along the base of the thumb, with the index finger extended along the top rear of the blade and the thumb along the side of the handle. This grip is best for initial incisions and larger cuts.

Pencil grip 

Best used for more accurate cuts with smaller blades (e.g. #15) and the #7 handle. The scalpel is held with the tips of the first and second fingers and the tip of the thumb with the handle resting on the fleshy base of the index finger and thumb. Care should be taken not to allow the handle to rest too far along the index finger as this promotes an unstable grip and cramped fingers.

Graphic design and arts and crafts blades 

Graphical and model-making scalpels tend to have round handles, with textured grips (either knurled metal or soft plastic). The blade is usually flat and straight, allowing it to be run easily against a straightedge to produce straight cuts.

There are many kinds of graphic arts blades; the most common around the graphic design studio is the #11 blade which is very similar to a #11 surgical blade (q.v.). Other blade shapes are used for wood carving, cutting leather and heavy fabric, etc.

Historical scalpels 
 Obsidian scalpels older than 2100 BC have been found in a Bronze Age settlement in Turkey. Skulls from the same time and place show signs of brain surgery.
 Ancient Egyptians made incisions for embalming with scalpels of sharpened obsidian, a material that is still in use.
 The first medical writings of ancient Greeks indicate they were commonly using tools identical to today's scalpels around 500 BC. The amphismela was an anatomical knife, edged on both sides. The term comes from the Greek αμφι (utrinque, "on both sides"), and μελιζω (incido, "I cut").
 Ancient Romans used more than 150 different surgical instruments, including scalpels.
 Indian Ayurvedic medicine mentions the use of sharp bamboo splinters.
 10th century Arab-Spanish surgeon Albucasis invented a retractable scalpel.
 The French used an amphismela, an anatomical knife, edged on both sides, in the 1700s. The term comes from the Greek αμφι (utrinque, "on both sides"), and μελιζω (incido, "I cut").
 South-African scientists showed that a blunt scalpel caused sharp cuts if the blade was subjected to ultrasound. Applications might be in energy-saving paper cutting.

Scalpel injuries 

Rising awareness of the dangers of sharps in a medical environment around the beginning of the 21st century led to the development of various methods of protecting healthcare workers from accidental cuts and puncture wounds. According to the Centers for Disease Control and Prevention, as many as 1,000 people were subject to accidental needle sticks and lacerations each day in the United States while providing medical care. Additionally, surgeons can expect to suffer hundreds of such injuries over the course of their career. Scalpel blade injuries were among the most frequent sharps injuries, second only to needlesticks. Scalpel injuries made up 7 percent to 8 percent of all sharps injuries in 2001.

"Scalpel Safety" is a term coined to inform users that there are choices available to them to ensure their protection from this common sharps injury.

Safety scalpels 
Safety scalpels are becoming increasingly popular as their prices come down and also on account of legislation such as the Needle Stick Prevention Act, which requires hospitals to minimize the risk of pathogen transmission through needle or scalpel-related accidents.

There are essentially two kinds of disposable safety scalpels offered by various manufacturers. They can be either classified as retractable blade or retractable sheath type. The retractable blade version made by companies such as OX Med Tech, DeRoyal, Jai Surgicals, Swann Morton, and PenBlade are more intuitive to use due to their similarities to a standard box-cutter.  Retractable sheath versions have much stronger ergonomic feel for the doctors and are made by companies such as Aditya Dispomed, Aspen Surgical and Southmedic.
A few companies  have also started to offer a safety scalpel with a reusable metal handle. In such models, the blade is usually protected in a cartridge. Such systems usually require a custom handle and the price of blades and cartridges is considerably more than for conventional surgical blades.

However, CDC studies shows that up to 87% of active medical devices are not activated. Safety scalpels are active devices and therefore the risk of not activating is still significant. There is a study that indicated there were actually four times more injuries with safety scalpels than reusable scalpels.

Blade removers 
There are various scalpel blade removers on the market that allows users to safely remove blades from the handle, instead of dangerously using fingers or forceps. In the medical field, when taking into account activation rates, the combination of a single-handed scalpel blade remover with a passing tray or a neutral zone was as safe and up to five times safer than a safety scalpel. There are companies which offer a single-handed scalpel blade remover that complies with regulatory requirements such as US Occupational Safety and Health Administration Standards.

Safety 
The usage of both safety scalpels and a single-handed blade remover, combined with a hands-free passing technique, are potentially effective in reducing scalpel blade injuries. It is up to employers and scalpel users to consider and use safer and more effective scalpel safety measures when feasible.

See also
 Laser scalpel
 Medical device
 The Lancet

References

External links
 Sonic scalpel

 scalpel

Medical knives
Surgical instruments